Aliyyah Koloc (born 1 July 2004) is a racing driver.

Biography

Koloc's father Martin is Czech and a former truck racer as well as the owner of the Buggyra Racing Team. Her mother is Seychelloise-Sudanese and her twin sister Yasmeen is also a racing driver. Koloc has Asperger syndrome.

Born in Dubai, Koloc began her sporting career in tennis at the age of four before an injury prevented her from furthering her career. After taking part in a test in one of her fathers' racing trucks in early 2019, she switched to motorsport with the goal of competing in the Dakar Rally. Starting out in trucks, her program quickly grew to accommodate stock cars, GT4 and rally raid in order to improve her versatility, leading to a title in the FIA Middle East Cup for Cross-Country Bajas in 2022 ahead of her Dakar debut.

Racing record

Career summary

*Season in progress

Dakar Rally

References

External links

Official website
Driver Database profile

2004 births
Living people
Czech racing drivers
Emirati racing drivers
People with Asperger syndrome
24H Series drivers
Dakar Rally drivers
NASCAR drivers
Seychellois sportswomen
Czech rally drivers
Emirati rally drivers
Sportspeople from Dubai
Emirati people of Sudanese descent
Czech twins
Emirati twins
Seychellois twins
Emirati female racing drivers
Czech female racing drivers